The MV Kavaratti is a cruise ship that operates between the city of Kochi and the Lakshadweep islands. The ship was built in Hindustan shipyard Limited, Visakhapatnam and is painted white.

MV Kavaratti, was designed especially for the Lakshadweep Islands to promote tourism. The 120 meter long ship with a total carrying capacity of 700 passengers and 200 tons of cargo is the largest passenger vessel ever created in India that is built with a total estimated cost of Rs. 173 crore INR.

The Ship has six decks, the topmost being an open deck with the bridge and a helipad. The 3rd, 4th and the 5th deck have two bed cabins whereas the 1st and the 2nd deck have bunk beds and lower class cabins. There is a swimming pool on the 5th deck. There is a recreation hall at the front side and a cafeteria at the rear side  on the 4th deck. A hospital and an information desk are on the 3rd deck. Main embarkation door is at 3rd deck and secondary embarkation doors are at the 1st deck.

References 

Ships built in India